is a Japanese professional footballer who plays as a winger for Sanfrecce Hiroshima.

Career statistics

Club
Updated to 22 February 2019.

1Includes Emperor's Cup.
2Includes J. League Cup.
3Includes AFC Champions League.
4Includes FIFA Club World Cup, Japanese Super Cup and J. League Championship.

Honours

Club
Sanfrecce Hiroshima
J1 League (3) : 2012, 2013, 2015
J2 League (1) : 2008
Japanese Super Cup (4) : 2008, 2013, 2014, 2016

References

External links

Profile at Shimizu S-Pulse
Profile at Sanfrecce Hiroshima 

1989 births
Living people
People from Munakata, Fukuoka
Association football people from Fukuoka Prefecture
Japanese footballers
J1 League players
J2 League players
Sanfrecce Hiroshima players
Shimizu S-Pulse players
Ventforet Kofu players
Association football midfielders